Hope Emerson (October 29, 1897 – April 24, 1960;) was an American actress, vaudevillian, nightclub performer, and strongwoman.

Career
Emerson made her Broadway debut in Lysistrata in 1930, when theatrical producer Norman Bel Geddes cast her for the role of Lamputo, an Amazon. She made her film début in Smiling Faces (1932) but then returned to the theater. In 1947, critic Brooks Atkinson praised her performance ("vastly entertaining as the garrulous old crone") in Street Scene. In the 1940s, Emerson was also known as the voice of "Elsie the Cow" in radio commercials for Borden Milk.

Some of Emerson's more memorable roles were as a circus strongwoman in the film Adam's Rib (1949), lifting actor Spencer Tracy up in the air; as a nefarious masseuse-conspirator in the noirish Cry of the City (1948); and as a mail-order bride in Westward the Women (1952); as a prospector in an episode of Death Valley Days ("Big Liz") (1958). Her most famous character, however, was the sadistic prison matron Evelyn Harper in Caged (1950), a role that garnered her an Academy Award nomination for Best Supporting Actress.

On television, Emerson guest-starred in "Housekeeper", the final episode of the series It's a Great Life. In that episode she portrays a bossy housekeeper who temporarily takes charge while Amy Morgan, played by Frances Bavier, is away on vacation. In 1957, she guest-starred in "The Inheritance," an episode of the CBS situation comedy Mr. Adams and Eve. She had a regular role as Mother on the detective series Peter Gunn (1958–1961), for which she received an Emmy nomination. She left Peter Gunn after its first season and was succeeded in the same role by Minerva Urecal, who bore a strong resemblance to Emerson but was far (8 inches) shorter. Emerson left Peter Gunn for a starring role on the CBS sitcom The Dennis O'Keefe Show (1959–60). She appeared in every episode of its single season run but died 16 days before the final episode aired.

References

External links
 
 
 Profile, Turner Classic Movies website; accessed April 23, 2016
 
http://sumshee.com/hope-emerson.html

1897 births
1960 deaths
People from Hawarden, Iowa
Actresses from Iowa
American child actresses
American film actresses
American stage actresses
American television actresses
Deaths from liver disease
Vaudeville performers
Singers from Iowa
Strongwomen
20th-century American actresses
20th-century American singers
20th-century American women singers